The Central Bank of Djibouti is the monetary authority of Djibouti. It is responsible for managing the country's currency, the Djiboutian franc, as well as the national foreign exchange position and accounting.

Duties
Objectives of the Central Bank of Djibouti include:

 To issue and redeem notes and coins 
 To supervise, regulate and inspect any financial institution which operates in and from within Djibouti 
 To promote the financial stability and soundness of financial institutions 
 To supervise, regulate or approve the issue of financial instruments by financial institutions or by residents 
 To assist with the detection and prevention of financial crime 
 To foster close relations between financial institutions themselves and between the financial institutions and the Government 
 To manage exchange control and regulate transactions in foreign currency or gold on behalf of the Government 
 To advise and assist the Government and public bodies on banking and other financial and monetary matters 
 To perform such functions as may be necessary to fulfill the said objects.

The bank is responsible to the government of Djibouti. It was established by the decree 79030 of 18 April 1979.

Governors 
Abdi Mohamed Luc Aden, 1979-1991
Djama Mahamoud Haid, 1991-2013
Ahmed Osman Ali, 2013-

See also
Central banks and currencies of Africa
Djiboutian franc, the unit of currency
Economy of Djibouti
List of central banks

References

External links
 Official site of Banque Centrale de Djibouti

Banks of Djibouti
Economy of Djibouti
Djibouti
1979 establishments in Djibouti
Banks established in 1979